The men's association football tournament at the 2011 Pan American Games was held in Guadalajara, Mexico at the Omnilife Stadium from October 19 to 28, 2011. Associations affiliated with FIFA were invited to send their men's U-22 national teams, with 3 no-age-limit players per team allowed.  Ecuador were the defending champions from the 2007 Pan American Games in Rio de Janeiro, defeating Jamaica 2–1, but they were eliminated during the group stage.

For these Games, the men competed in an eight-team tournament, which is a drop from 12 at the 2007 games. Preliminary matches commenced on October 19. The teams were grouped into two pools of four teams each for a round-robin preliminary round. The top two teams in each pool advanced to a four-team single-elimination bracket.

Mexico won the gold medal for the fourth time in this competition, defeating six-time gold-medalists Argentina in the tournament's final. Uruguay took the bronze medal.

Teams

Qualification

The highest finisher from each the Caribbean and Central American regions will qualify, along with the best qualifying team from either region.
 Guatemala later withdrew due to issues of discipline within the team. They were replaced by Trinidad and Tobago, after Honduras and Panama who finished ahead of Trinidad and Tobago declined to participate.

Squads

The men's tournament is a full international tournament with a U-22 age limit.  Each nation must submit a squad of 18 players September 2011. A minimum of two goalkeepers (plus one optional alternate goalkeeper) must be included in the squad.

Format
 Eight teams are split into 2 preliminary round groups of 4 teams each. The top 2 teams from each group qualify for the knockout stage.
 The third and fourth placed teams are eliminated from the competition.
 In the semifinals, the matchups are as follows: A1 vs. B2 and B1 vs. A2
 The winning teams from the semifinals play for the gold medal. The losing teams compete for the bronze medal.

Preliminary round
All times are local Central Daylight Time (UTC-5)

Group A

Match was moved to October 25, because of a volcanic eruption spewed ash clouds in Chile which prevented the team from Uruguay to travel to Guadalajara in time.

Group B

Knockout stage

Semifinals

Bronze Medal match

Gold Medal match

Goalscorers

6 goals
 Oribe Peralta

3 goals
 Jonathan McDonald
 Jerónimo Amione

2 goals
 Germán Pezzella
 Henrique

1 goal

 Sergio Araujo
 Franco Fragapane
 Lucas Kruspzky
 Matías Laba
 Danny Blanco
 Luis Congo
 Michael Quiñónez
 Jorge Enríquez
 Miguel Ángel Ponce
 Jesús Zavala
 Trevin Caesar
 Jamal Gay
 Shahdon Winchester
 Mathías Abero
 Facundo Píriz
 Mauricio Prieto
 Federico Puppo
 Maximiliano Rodríguez
 Gastón Silva

Medalists

Final standings

References

2011
Football at the 2011 Pan American Games